James Henry Kinmel Sangster (2 December 1927 – 19 August 2011) was a British screenwriter and director, most famous for his work on the initial horror films made by the British company Hammer Films, including The Curse of Frankenstein (1957) and Dracula (1958).

Early life 
The son of an estate agent, Sangster was born in Kimmel Bay, North Wales and was educated at Ewell Castle School in Surrey, and Llandaff Cathedral School in Cardiff. He began his film career, aged 16, as a clapper-boy.

After service with the RAF, he worked as a third assistant director on Ealing Studios productions, then joined Exclusive Studios (later Hammer Films) in 1949.

Career
Sangster originally worked as a production assistant at Hammer Films, as well as being an assistant director, second unit director and production manager. After Hammer's success with The Quatermass Xperiment, he was approached to write X the Unknown, to which he replied "I'm not a writer. I'm a production manager." According to him, Hammer Films' response was: "Well, you come up with a couple of ideas and if we like it, we'll pay you. If we don't like it, we won't pay you. You're being paid as a production manager, so you can't complain." Sangster later turned to direction with The Horror of Frankenstein and Lust for a Vampire (both 1970) for the studio, but with far less success. His third (and last) film as director was Fear in the Night (1972), which resurrected the psychological woman-in-peril thriller he had begun with his script for Taste of Fear (1961). All three of the films he directed featured actor Ralph Bates, a friend of Sangster's and one of Hammer's better-known performers for the company during the 1970s.

Sangster scripted and produced two films for Bette Davis, The Nanny (1965) and The Anniversary (1968). His other scriptwriting credits included The Siege of Sidney Street (1960), which starred Donald Sinden and in which Sangster appeared as Winston Churchill. His many television screenwriting credits include Kolchak: The Night Stalker, Movin' On, The Magician, B. J. and the Bear, Most Wanted, Ironside, McCloud, The Six Million Dollar Man and Wonder Woman.

He is also the author of the novels Touchfeather, Touchfeather, Too, Foreign Exchange, Private I (aka The Spy Killer) Snowball, Hardball, and Blackball, all of which have been republished by Brash Books. His other books include the novel Your Friendly Neighborhood Death Peddler, the non-fiction memoir Do You Want it Good or Tuesday? and the 2003 screenwriting manual, Screenwriting: Techniques for Success. In 2019, Brash Books announced the discovery of an unpublished Sangster novel, Fireball, which they will be releasing in 2020.

Personal life
Sangster died at his home in Kensington, London on 19 August 2011. He was survived by his third wife, the actress Mary Peach; a son from an earlier marriage, Mark James Sangster; and two grandchildren, Claire and Ian Sangster.

As a director

As a screenwriter

References

External links
 
 
 Jimmy Sangster at CinemaRetro.com
 

1927 births
2011 deaths
Hammer Film Productions
British television writers
British male screenwriters
Welsh film directors
Welsh screenwriters
Screenwriting instructors
British instructional writers
British male television writers